Susten Pass (German: Sustenpass) (el. 2260 m.) is a mountain pass in the Swiss Alps. The pass road, built from 1938–1945, connects Innertkirchen in the canton of Bern with Wassen in the canton of Uri. A 300-metre long tunnel crosses the pass at 2,224 metres.

The pass is popular with tourists, especially for the views of the Stein Glacier on the south side.

The length and elevation of west/east climbs are respectively:

 Innertkirchen (west): 27km (1599m)
 Wassen (east): 17.7km (1308m)

See also
 List of highest paved roads in Europe
 List of mountain passes
List of the highest Swiss passes

References

External links 

Profile on climbbybike.com (from Wassen)
Profile on climbbybike.com (from Innertkirchen)
Pictures from Sustenpass, summer 2011

Mountain passes of Switzerland
Mountain passes of the Alps
Mountain passes of the canton of Uri
Bernese Oberland
Mountain passes of the canton of Bern
Bern–Uri border